The Elms is a housing estate built by the town council in the 1950s to provide social housing on the south-western edge of Ripley, Derbyshire, England. It took its name from The Elms farm whose land it was built on. The house, called The Elms, was converted into flats and the farm yard and outbuildings were used as a depot by the council until demolition around the 1970s when sheltered housing was built on the site. The houses on the estate are traditionally built red brick, mainly three and four bedroom with the occasional five bedroom.

Street names
The streets are all named after trees. The estate comprises the following streets:
 Almond Avenue
 Ash Crescent
 Chestnut Avenue
 Cedar Avenue
 Cherry Tree Avenue
 Elms Avenue
 Hawthorne Avenue 
 Hazeltree Close
 Holly Avenue
 Larch Avenue
 Laurel Avenue
 Maple Avenue
 Oak Avenue
 Pear Tree Avenue
 Poplar Avenue
 Rowan Avenue
 Sycamore Avenue
 Willow Avenue
 Woodside Avenue

References

Buildings and structures in Derbyshire
Housing estates in England